Ptichodis bistriga is a moth of the family Erebidae first described by Gottlieb August Wilhelm Herrich-Schäffer in 1869. It is found on Cuba.

References

Moths described in 1869
Ptichodis
Endemic fauna of Cuba